chomikuj.pl, or Chomik (Polish for hamster), is a Polish file hosting service founded in 2006. As of February 2013 it was the 15th most popular website in Poland.

Any type of file can be published on the website. Unregistered users can instantly retrieve file sizes of 1 MB. After registration, a user is not subject to any limit when downloading a single file, but is limited to 50 MB transfer a week. The transfer limit can be increased by paying for additional bandwidth.

In 2015, it was successfully sued for copyright infringement, although it immediately appealed to the court.

References

External links
 

File hosting
Online companies of Poland
Cloud storage
Internet properties established in 2006
2006 establishments in Poland